Tadej is a masculine Slovenian given name. Notable people with the name include:

Tadej Apatič (born 1987), Slovenian footballer
Tadej Ferme (born 1991), Slovenian basketball player
Tadej Golob (born 1967), Slovenian mountain climber and writer
Tadej Matijašić (born 1994), Slovenian handball player
Tadej Rems (born 1993), Slovenian footballer
Tadej Trdina (born 1988), Slovenian footballer
Tadej Valjavec (born 1977), Slovenian cyclist
Tadej Vidmajer (born 1992), Slovenian footballer
Tadej Žagar-Knez (born 1991), Slovenian footballer
Tadej Mazej (born 1998), Slovenian handballer
Tadej Pogačar (born 1998), Slovenian cyclist.
Tadej Lenarcić (born 1992), Slovenian e-sport player.

See also
Thaddeus

Slovene masculine given names